The Chiesa di Santo Stefano (Church of St. Stephen) is a large Roman Catholic church at the northern end of the Campo Santo Stefano in the sestiere of San Marco, Venice, Italy.

History
It was founded in the 13th century, rebuilt in the 14th century and altered again early in the 15th century, when the fine gothic doorway and ship's keel roof were added. The tall interior is also Gothic in style and has three apses.

Santo Stefano is parish church of one of the parishes in the Vicariate of San Marco-Castello. The other churches of the parish are San Samuele, San Maurizio, San Vidal and the Oratorio di San Angelo degli Zoppi.

Works of art
 Antonio Canova (stele commemorating Giovanni Falier in the baptistery)
 Pietro Lombardo (tomb of Giacomo Surian)
 Tullio Lombardo (two marble statuettes in the sacristy (attributed))
 Tintoretto (The Agony in the Garden, The Last Supper and The Washing of the Disciples' Feet, all in the sacristy)
 Paolo Veneziano (painted Crucifix in the sacristy)
 Bartolomeo Vivarini (St Lawrence and St Nicholas of Bari in the sacristy)

Funerary monuments
 Doge Andrea Contarini (d.1382)
 Giovanni Falier
  Doge Francesco Morosini
 Giacomo Surian
 Giovanni Gabrieli (d. 1612)

External links

Satellite image from Google Maps (at the top end of the long Campo Santo Stefano)

Roman Catholic churches in Venice
14th-century Roman Catholic church buildings in Italy
Religious organizations established in the 13th century
Gothic architecture in Venice